Damjanić (literally "little Damjan"), also transliterated as Damjanich, is a Serbian and Croatian surname. It may refer to:

Damir Damjanić, basketball player
János Damjanich/Jovan Damjanić (1804–1849), Hungarian general of Serb origin
Oleg Damjanić, Bosnian Serb football player
Viktor Damjanić (born 2005), Croatian footballer

See also
Damjanović
Damnjanović
Damijanić

Serbian surnames
Croatian surnames
Patronymic surnames